Rajavommangi is a village and a Rajavommangi Mandal in Alluri Sitharama Raju district in the state of Andhra Pradesh in India.

References 

Villages in East Godavari district